Celeste is the debut album by new wave pop band My Tiger My Timing, released on 2 July 2012.

Track listing 
All songs written by My Tiger My Timing.
 "Wasteland" – 3:36
 "Written in Red" – 3:25
 "The Gold Rush" – 4:12
 "Let Me Go" – 3:38
 "After School" – 3:49
 "On My Record Player" – 3:33
 "Endless Summer" – 3:27
 "Honest" – 3:08
 "Memories of Earth" – 3:59
 "Your Way" – 4:14

Personnel 
 Anna Vincent– vocals, keyboards, programming
 James Vincent– bass, guitar, backing vocals
 Jamie Harrison – bass, guitar, backing vocals
 Gary Drain – drums, backing vocals
 Sebastian Underhill - synthesizer, keyboards, vocals

References 

2012 debut albums
My Tiger My Timing albums